Expensive Women is a 1931 American pre-Code film drama. It was produced by First National Pictures and distributed through their parent company Warner Bros. The film was directed by silent film veteran Hobart Henley and stars Dolores Costello. It was Costello's final film as a leading lady and star for Warners, which she had been since 1925. She retired to be the wife of John Barrymore and to raise their family. Costello would return to films five years later after a long hiatus and the end of her marriage to Barrymore, but never regained the luster she enjoyed as a Warners star.

A print is preserved in the Library of Congress collection.

Plot
A woman in love with a composer stands trial for another man.

Cast
 Dolores Costello as Constance "Connie" Newton
 H. B. Warner as Melville Raymond
 Warren William as Neil Hartley
 Anthony Bushell as Arthur Raymond
 Polly Walters  as Molly Lane
 Joe Donahue as  Bobby Brandon
 George Irving as Melville's friend
 Billy House as George Allison

Uncredited
 Allan Lane as partier
 Mae Madison as Irene
 Margaret Mann
 Cliff Saum  as Taxi driver
 Morgan Wallace as Young man
 Adele Watson as Martha, Connie's maid

References

External links
 1893-1993

Expensive Women lobby poster

1931 films
Films directed by Hobart Henley
Warner Bros. films
1931 drama films
American drama films
American black-and-white films
1930s American films
1930s English-language films